Rowridge is a hamlet on the Isle of Wight towards the west in an area known as West Wight. It is the location of the Rowridge transmitting station, a 149.6 metres (491 ft) tall guyed transmitting mast. It is in the civil parish of Newport and Carisbrooke.

Villages on the Isle of Wight